John Manning (born 23 February 1978) is an Australian actor, radio presenter and former rugby league footballer who played for the North Queensland Cowboys in the National Rugby League. He primarily played .

Playing career
A Mackay Brothers junior, Manning joined the North Queensland Cowboys in 1996 as an 18-year old. In 1998, he played for the Cowboys' Queensland Cup feeder club, the Townsville Stingers. 

In Round 23 of the 1999 NRL season, Manning made his NRL debut in the Cowboys' 24–30 loss to the Melbourne Storm. He played four games in his rookie season for the club, spending the majority of the season playing for the Cairns Cyclones in the Queensland Cup. In 2000, he scored his first NRL try in a 16–26 loss to the Brisbane Broncos. After 15 games for the Cowboys, Manning left the club at the end of the 2002 season. In 2003, he joined the Melbourne Storm but did not play NRL, spending the season playing for the Norths Devils in the Queensland Cup. 

In 2019, Manning became the first head coach of the Los Angeles Mongrel.

Statistics

NRL
 Statistics are correct to the end of the 2001 season

Acting career
After retiring from rugby league, Manning moved to Sydney where he studied at the National Institute of Dramatic Arts. He has gone on to have roles in a number of Australian television series, including Tricky Business and Home and Away, and the film Terminus.

Radio career 
In 2021, Manning returned to Australia and his hometown Mackay, where he began hosting the Saturday breakfast program on ABC Tropical North.

Filmography

Film

Television

References

1978 births
Living people
Australian rugby league players
21st-century Australian male actors
Australian male television actors
Australian male film actors
North Queensland Cowboys players
Norths Devils players
Rugby league players from Mackay, Queensland
Rugby league second-rows